Radoslav (Lale) Pavlović (born 8 September 1954, in Aleksandrovac, Serbia) is a Serbian writer. Pavlovic authored numerous theatre plays and film/TV scripts popular with the audience and acclaimed by the critics. He is best known for his theatre plays Šovinistička farsa, performed more than a thousand times across ex-Yugoslavia, Mala, and Moja Draga performed for hundreds of times in Belgrade theaters, as well as movies Balkan Rules (1997), Living like the rest of us (1983), Hajde da se volimo 3 (1990) featuring ex-Yugoslavia mega-star Lepa Brena, and TV series Moj Rodjak sa Sela (2008) scoring record viewership of over 3 million viewers per episode.

From 2012 to 2017 Pavlović served as advisor for Culture to the President of Serbia, Tomislav Nikolić. In the context of his political role, Pavlović was working on causes related to Serbia's historical heritage and raising awareness of it within public, such as the life and work of Alexander I of Yugoslavia, or the Edict of Milan issued by Constantine the Great who was born in Serbia. Prior to taking the Advisor position, Pavlović served as deputy Editor in Chief of the Cultural and Educational Programme at the National Radio Television of Serbia.

Pavlović currently serves as Director of the Cultural Centre of Serbia in Paris.

Early life
Pavlović was born on 9 August 1954, in Aleksandrovac to father Rajko, and mother Miroslava, both school teachers, respectively from Rogojevac and Kikojevac, typical Šumadija villages. The family moved to Belgrade  where he finished elementary school, high-school and university (dramaturgy major). Autobiographical elements can often be found in his work, and references to his childhood in Šumadija are common, especially in Moj Rodjak sa Sela set in a village in Šumadija.

Playwright career
Pavlović's first play, Savremenik, attracted the eye of theatre professionals in Serbia. As a result, the play was presented at the festival Sterijino pozorje 1979. and Pavlović was distinguished as the most promising young playwright. Not much later Pavlović wrote his first major theatre play Šovinistička farsa that had four sequels from 1985 to 1998 and was performed for more than 1800 times (the first sequel being performed 1200 times), with main actors Predrag Ejdus and Josif Tatić. The play received several awards, including the Best script award at 11th Satire days in Zagreb, 1986, and remains one of Pavlović's best-known theatre plays.

After Šovinistička farsa, Pavlović continued to write plays for Belgrade theatres, such as Braća po oružju, Život Jovanov or Mala (performed for 173 times, and seen by 57 376 people and later adapted to a movie The Little One (movie)).

This led to a peak of his theatre career in late '80s and early '90s when the audience could simultaneously see five of his plays in theatres at the same time (Muke po Živojinu, Šovinistička farsa, Mala, Čaruga, and U potrazi za izgubljenom srećom). Due to popular demand some plays had to be performed more than once a day (such as the play  Moja Draga).

In theatre, Pavlović collaborates with many famous Serbian actors, such as Marko Nikolić (actor), Predrag Laković, Danilo Lazović, Dragan Jovanović (actor), Anica Dobra, Katarina Žutić, Lazar Ristovski, Dragan Bjelogrlić, Žarko Laušević, Nikola Kojo, Renata Ulmanski, musicians such as Osvajači and Bajaga  and directors such as Darko Bajić.
In later career, Pavlović wrote two sequels of the series Moj Rodjak sa Sela with motives from his home Šumadija. The series offer an alternative view to the modern Serbian village, focusing on elements that were previously less present on the TV screen, even forgotten or unknown to the modern audience in the domain of architecture, costume, narrative and historical references. The series brought together numerous famous Serbian actors such as Vojin Ćetković, Dubravka Mijatović, Nikola Kojo, Dragan Jovanović, Vera Čukić, Nebojša Glogovac, Petar Božović, Tanasije Uzunović and Opera primadonna Jadranka Jovanović. The series reached a record audience of 3 million viewers per episode, which was substantial for Serbian market composed of only 7 million people at the time.

Career at Radio Television of Serbia
At the beginnings of his career, Pavlović worked as editor at the national television,  Radio Television of Serbia, and gave up this job to focus on his writing career that took off with popularity of his work with the audience. He went back to Radio Television of Serbia as deputy Editor in Chief of the Cultural and Educational Programme in 2009.

Political Career and Views
Since March 2008, Pavlović is a member of Serbian Progressive Party, and the president of the Party's Culture Council. About his reasons for starting a political career Pavlović said for Glas javnosti:

From 2017 he serves as Director of the Cultural Centre of Serbia in Paris. From 2012 to 2017, he served as advisor to the Serbian President Tomislav Nikolić. He briefly served as President of the board of the National Theatre in Belgrade but resigned in 2013.

Notable works

Films
Pavlović wrote scripts for many popular movies of Serbian and ex-Yugoslavian culture.

TV

Theatre Plays

Literature
 Moj rodjak sa sela, Radoslav Pavlović, Beogradska knjiga (2010), 
 Moj rodjak sa sela 2, Radoslav Pavlović, Beogradska knjiga (2011), 
 Kraljica zanrova, Radoslav Pavlović, Beogradska knjiga (2010), 
 Politicko pozoriste, Radoslav Pavlović, Beogradska knjiga (2010), 
 Beogradski komadi, Radoslav Pavlović, Beogradska knjiga (2010), 
 'Aleksandar Prvi Karadjordjević', Radoslav Pavlović, Zavod za udžbenike (2015),

References

|-

1954 births
Living people
University of Belgrade alumni
Serbian dramatists and playwrights
Serbian screenwriters
Male screenwriters